There are 24 Municipal councils in Sri Lanka, which are the legislative bodies that preside over the largest cities and first tier municipalities in the country. Introduced in 1987 through the 13th Amendment to the Constitution of Sri Lanka, municipal councils became a devolved subject under the Provincial Councils in the Local Government system of Sri Lanka. Until 2017 municipal councils collectively governed 2,765,533 people within a 698 square kilometer area. There were 445 Councillors in total, ranging from 53 to 9 per council.

The last council to be created was Polonnaruwa Municipal Council on 30 June 2017, bifurcated from Thamankaduwa Pradeshiya Sabha.

Municipal councils

Parties

Notes

See also
List of cities in Sri Lanka
Provincial government in Sri Lanka
Local government in Sri Lanka
Urban councils of Sri Lanka
Pradeshiya Sabha

References

External links
 Ministry of Local Government & Provincial Councils

 
Populated places in Sri Lanka
Sri Lanka, List of cities in
Municipalities